Mavis Cheek (born 1948) is an English novelist, author of 15 novels. Some of these have been widely translated into other languages.

Life
Born in Wimbledon, now part of London, Mavis only met her father once, at the age of seven. Her mother worked in a factory to keep the family together and life was lived in a fairly hand-to-mouth fashion. However it was no life of misery, but a reasonably happy childhood lived in a pleasant area of London.

Mavis was educated in church schools until the age of 11 when she failed her eleven-plus examination and was placed in the B stream of her girls' secondary modern school in Raynes Park. They did not do O-levels in her stream, but they did do drama. She appeared in school plays, including the title role of Julius Caesar, which began her lifelong love of theatre. She left school at 16 to become a receptionist with Editions Alecto, a Kensington art publishing company. They produced the first series of etchings by David Hockney, "A Rake's Progress", and other groundbreaking works by contemporary artists. She later moved to the firm's gallery in Albemarle Street, where she dealt with Hockney and other artists like Allen Jones, Patrick Caulfield and Gillian Ayres. In 1969 she married a "childhood sweetheart", whom she had met at a meeting of the Young Communist League in New Malden, when she was fifteen. They both attended the Wimbledon Youth Parliament. They separated when she was in her mid-twenties. Following this and after twelve happy years working with Editions Alecto, Mavis left to take a degree at Hillcroft College, a further education college for women, from which she graduated in the Arts with distinction. Shortly after this her daughter Bella by the artist Basil Beattie was born.

Although Cheek had planned to take a degree course, she turned instead to fiction writing while her daughter was a child, reading her early efforts to weekly meetings of the Richmond Community Centre Writers' Circle, which she attended for several years. She completed a first, very serious novel, which she says she is thankful was never published. Instead she found her metier in "beady-eyed humour". She moved from London to Berkshire in 2001 and finally to Aldbourne in the Wiltshire countryside in 2003.

Cheek was a moving force in 2010 behind the Marlborough LitFest. Her vision was to stop the celebrities taking over such festivals and celebrate authors who objectively write well. This has proved successful. Cheek also teaches creative writing for the Arvon Foundation, for Tŷ Newydd, the Welsh affiliate to Arvon, and elsewhere. The occasions have varied from university weekend schools to voluntary work on courses at Holloway and Erlestoke prisons. As she described in an article, "What I see [at Erlstoke] is reflected in my own experience. Bright, overlooked, unconfident men, who are suddenly given the opportunity to learn, grow wings and dare to fail. It helps to be able to tell them that I, too, was once designated thick by a very silly [education] system. My prisoners have written some brilliant stuff, and perhaps it gives them back some self-esteem." She has been Royal Literary Fund fellow at Chichester University (twice) and at the University of Reading. She gives talks and readings at Festivals, at literary lunches and as an after-dinner speaker. In 2011 and 2012 she was the judge for the Society of Authors' McKitterick Prize, awarded for a first novel.

Cheek has expressed interest in environmental issues, notably her carbon footprint as a gas-guzzling former countrywoman. She has also appeared in discussions of literature and classical music on the BBC, in Michael Berkley's Private Passions and Sarah Walker's morning programme.

Writings
The subject of Mavis Cheek's first published novel, Pause between Acts (1988), is an amused look at her own dismay at discovering that a favourite actor, Ian McKellen, was gay. It won the She/John Menzies Prize for a first novel. She wrote it after being advised by a literary agent, Imogen Parker, that comedy was art and that she should forget about her serious novel as she seemed a natural at humour. Her favourite review classed her as "Jane Austen in Modern Dress." Her sales of 90,000 with Mrs Fytton's Country Life (2000) doubled her previous record. She says of her writing (2012) that she is one in a line of feminist, subversive women authors – with jokes. Six of her novels were being reissued in 2019, including Amenable Women.

Cheek's work is full of comedy. She claims to pay little attention to plot, but enjoys dotting her work with literary quotations and allusions. As one journalist put it in 2006, "Mavis Cheek is generally acknowledged by those who generally acknowledge these things to be a writer of the genre known as 'comedies of manners' who may count herself in the same class as Jane Austen and Charlotte Brontë and Barbara Pym. She describes, as they did, the relationship between herself and the society in which she finds herself, and is often, as they were, excruciatingly funny about it without ever being remotely arch...." She has mentioned Jane Austen, George Eliot, Arnold Bennett, Stella Gibbons, William Boyd and Beryl Bainbridge as "literary heroes". For "A Good Read" on the BBC Radio 4 programme of that name broadcast on 7 June 2011 she chose Micka by Frances Kay. Her own novel, Janice Gentle Gets Sexy, was chosen for A Good Read in its year of paperback publication, 1994.

The Sex Life of My Aunt (2002), her tenth novel, draws liberally on her own background and childhood, including something of her family's uneasy relationships. There are strong autobiographical elements also in her twelfth novel, Yesterday's Houses (2006), about the beginning of a woman's life married to a house converter. Amenable Women (2008), her 13th novel, tells how a woman, freed from an infuriating husband by a fatal balloon accident, decides to complete a local history he began and then becomes deeply involved, through a Holbein portrait, with Anne of Cleves, the fourth wife of Henry VIII. Alison Weir, the historical writer and novelist, has said of this, "If you want to know the truth about Anne of Cleves, read this book." Cheek's most recent, 15th novel is The Lovers of Pound Hill (2011).

Novels by Mavis Cheek have been translated into German, Spanish, Polish, Croatian, Dutch, Italian, Greek, Hebrew and several other languages.

Bibliography

References

Sources
 An appearance at the 2006 Charleston Festival in Sussex, England: Retrieved 3 April 2012.
 A discussion of Patrick Parker's Progress on BBC Woman's Hour, 26 January 2004: Retrieved 3 April 2012.
 A discussion of Yesterday's Houses on BBC Woman's Hour, 3 February 2006: Retrieved 3 April 2012.
 Mavis Cheek short stories online: Jubilee Tuck: Retrieved 3 August 2012; A Wasp Sting: Retrieved 3 August 2012; A Suitable Evening Class: Retrieved 3 August 2012.
 A 2012 picture of Mavis Cheek talking with Margaret Drabble. Retrieved 3 August 2012.

Living people
People from Wimbledon, London
English women novelists
21st-century English women writers
Writers from London
People from Wiltshire
1948 births